Frognal is a ward in the London Borough of Camden, in the United Kingdom. The ward will represent Frognal in the western part of Hampstead. The ward previously existed between 1978 and 2002, and elected two councillors to Camden London Borough Council. It was used again for the 2022 Camden London Borough Council election, where it again elected two councillors. The ward covers most of the area of the previous Frognal and Fitzjohns ward, which has been abolished at the same time. In 2018, the ward had an electorate of 5,300. The Boundary Commission projects the electorate to rise to 5,965 in 2025.

Councillors

Election results

Elections in the 2020s

Elections in the 2000s

Elections in the 1990s

Elections in the 1980s

Elections in the 1970s

References

Wards of the London Borough of Camden
Frognal
1978 establishments in England
2002 disestablishments in England
2022 establishments in England